Aurora do Pará is a municipality in the state of Pará in the Northern region of Brazil.

See also
List of municipalities in Pará

References

Municipalities in Pará